Brooklands is an area and electoral ward of Manchester, England. It is represented in Westminster by Mike Kane, MP for Wythenshawe and Sale East. The 2011 Census recorded a population of 14,362.

Councillors 
Three councillors serve the ward: Julia Baker-Smith (Lab), Glynn Evans (Lab), and Sue Cooley (Lab). On  Sue Murphy died after a long illness.

 indicates seat up for re-election.
 indicates seat won in by-election.

Elections in 2020s 
* denotes incumbent councillor seeking re-election.

May 2021

Elections in 2010s

May 2019

May 2018

May 2016

May 2015

May 2014

May 2012

May 2011

May 2010

Elections in 2000s

Elections in 1990s

Elections in 1980s

Elections in 1970s

References

Areas of Manchester
Manchester City Council Wards
Wythenshawe